Pyropyga nigricans is a species of firefly in the family of beetles known as Lampyridae. It is found in Central America, North America and Central Europe.

References

Further reading

 
 

Lampyridae
Bioluminescent insects
Articles created by Qbugbot
Beetles described in 1823